Júlio Andrade (born 8 October 1976) is a Brazilian actor and director. He has already been nominated twice to the International Emmy Award for Best Actor for his role in 1 Contra Todos.

Career

Started acting for television in the miniseries Luna Caliente. Then in Porto Alegre participating in short films of RBS TV and the Theater Company of Porto Alegre, "Depósito de Teatro", acting in pieces such as Macbeth directed by Patricia Fagundes; I danced in the Curve, by Julio Contee; The Pagador De Promessas, by Dias Gomes; Auto da Compadecida with direction of Roberto Oliveira; and Menino Maluquinho directed by Adriane Motolla.

Filmography

Films

Television

Theater

Awards and nominations

International Emmy Awards

Festival International de Programmes Audiovisuels

Platino Awards

Brazilian Film Festival of Miami

Melhores do Ano

Festival de Gramado

Rio de Janeiro International Film Festival

Troféu APCA

| Grande Prêmio do Cinema Brasileiro

| 5th Brazilian International Film Festival

7th Lapa Film Festival

Prêmio APTC de Cinema Gaúcho

Ibero-American Film Festival

Agulhas Negras Film Festival

Guarani Brazilian Film Award

Botequim Cultural Award

Children's Theater Tibicuera Award

Prêmio Contigo! de Tv

Prêmio Folha de São Paulo

Extra Television Award

12° Awards Fiesp / Sesi-SP of Cinema and TV

Sesc Film Festival

Açorianos Theater Award

Prêmio Qualidade Brasil

Quem Award

Notes

External links 
 Júlio Andrade - IMDb

1976 births
Living people
20th-century Brazilian male actors
People from Porto Alegre
Brazilian male film actors
Brazilian male stage actors
Brazilian male television actors
Brazilian male telenovela actors